Terence Freeman (born 21 October 1931) was an English cricketer who played for Northamptonshire. He was born in Finedon, and is cousin of former Northamptonshire cricketer Robert Clarke.

Freeman made a single first-class appearance, during the 1954 season, against Hampshire, playing alongside his cousin. From the tailend, Freeman scored 1 run in the first innings in which he batted. He bowled 9 overs for 47 runs. Northamptonshire drew the match and Freeman never played for the county again.

External links
Terry Freeman at Cricket Archive

1931 births
English cricketers
Northamptonshire cricketers
People from Finedon
Living people